The 1927 North Tango earthquake occurred in Kyoto Prefecture, Japan on 7 March with a moment magnitude of 7.0. Up to 2,956 people were killed and 7,806 were injured. Almost all the houses in Mineyama (now part of Kyōtango) were destroyed as a result. The earthquake was felt as far away as Tokyo and Kagoshima.

Gallery

See also
 List of earthquakes in 1927
 List of earthquakes in Japan

References

External links 
 M7.0 - western Honshu, Japan – United States Geological Survey
 

1927 Kita Tango
1927 Kita Tango earthquake
1927 tsunamis
March 1927 events
Earthquakes of the Showa period
1927 disasters in Japan